The BTB E2E, also known as F 2/2 and De 2/2, were a pair of Swiss electric locomotives operated by Burgdorf Thun Bahn (BTB) in the early twentieth century. They are the oldest three phase locomotives designed for full service operation that have been preserved. The locomotives were built by Brown, Boveri & Cie (BBC) and Schweizerische Lokomotiv- und Maschinenfabrik (SLM) and entered service in 1899. They were powered by two  750V AC electric motors which drove two axles. Relegated to secondary duties when more powerful designs were introduced, the locomotives provided valuable service until 1930.

Description

Constructed in Switzerland by a collaboration between Brown, Boveri & Cie (BBC), who provided the mechanics, and Schweizerische Lokomotiv- und Maschinenfabrik (SLM), who contributed the electrics, the two E2E locomotives were introduced to pull goods on the BTB. Power was transmitted via a countershaft and coupling rods to two axles to power four driving wheels. The railway operated at 750V three phase AC, which was transmitted to the locomotive via a roof-mounted pantograph and overhead wires. The locomotives were equipped with a 100 V circuit for lighting, heating and other auxiliaries.

A driving cab with simple controls, including air brakes, was fitted to one end of the superstructure. A two speed gearbox, switchable when the locomotive was stationary, was fitted.

The gearbox proved to be problematic and was revised by SLM in 1900.

Service
The locomotives started operating on the railway between 1899, initially designated E2E. At first, they were used mainly for freight services, but the higher gear speed also allowed the locomotives to be used for passenger operations. With the introduction of more powerful locomotives, they were relegated to secondary duties. In 1902, they were redesignated F 2/2; subsequently they were reclassified as De 2/2 in 1922. Despite their obsolescence and the limitation of the two fixed speeds, the simple engine design proved reliable and the locomotives provided good service. After just over thirty years in service, they were retired in 1930.

Preservation
Both locomotives have been preserved as the first three-phase locomotives in full-service operation. No. 1 is part of the collection of the Deutsches Museum at Freilassing Locomotive World. No. 2 is housed at the Swiss Museum of Transport in Lucerne.

References

Citations

Bibliography
 
 
 

Electric locomotives of Switzerland
Preserved electric locomotives
Standard gauge locomotives of Switzerland
Railway locomotives introduced in 1899